UMCU may refer to:
 University Medical Center Utrecht, hospital in Utrecht, Netherlands
 University of Michigan Credit Union, credit union based in Ann Arbor, Michigan